Shaheed Ishwar Chowdhary Halt is a halt railway station on Gaya–Kiul line of Delhi–Kolkata Main Line in East Central Railway zone under Mughalsarai railway division of the Indian Railways. The railway station is situated at Manpur in Gaya district in the Indian state of Bihar.

References 

Railway stations in Gaya district
Mughalsarai railway division